Hamdhan Farooq (born 3 June 1983) is a Maldivian film actor.

Early life
Farooq was born on 3 June 1983 in Ga. Dhaandhoo. His parents, Ali Farooq and Mariyam Haleem are actors working in the film industry since 1997. He is the brother of actor Ravee Farooq and Hamdhoon Farooq. He credits his parents and brothers to be his inspiration to pursue a career in the film industry.

Career
In 2005, Farooq appeared in Mohamed Abdulla's comedy short films series Dheke Dhekeves in two of its installments, followed by several other productions from Abdulla's "Dheke Dhekeves" studio including Farihibe short film series and his comedy television series Mohamma Gaadiyaa. Ali Seezan's family drama Maafeh Neiy was released in 2010, where he appeared alongside Ali Seezan and Niuma Mohamed, playing the role of a heartless son-in-law. The film highlighting many social issues including human rights abuses, forced marriage and domestic violence was criticized for its melodrama. It was followed by Amjad Ibrahim's romantic horror film Vakinuvinama (2010) alongside Niuma Mohamed and Ravee Farooq, which was a critical and commercial failure. 

He then collaborated with Dark Rain Entertainment, for Ali Shifau-directed romantic comedy film Vaashey Mashaa Ekee (2016), where he played the role of a male nurse which was considered the "required comic element" in the film. Afterwards, he continued playing similar role of an effeminate man in several other production ventures of Dark Rain Entertainment including Mee Loaybakee (2017) and Maamui (2019), where he portrayed the role of a hairdresser and stylist in the latter which was positively received by the critics.

Filmography

Feature film

Television

Short film

References

External links
 

Living people
People from Malé
21st-century Maldivian actors
Maldivian film actors
1983 births